The 1995 NCAA Women's Division I Swimming and Diving Championships were contested at the 14th annual NCAA-sanctioned swim meet to determine the team and individual national champions of Division I women's collegiate swimming and diving in the United States. 

This year's events were hosted by the University of Texas at the Texas Swimming Center in Austin, Texas. 

Stanford once again topped the team standings, finishing 19 points ahead of Michigan. It was the Cardinal's fourth consecutive and seventh overall women's team title.

Team standings
Note: Top 10 only
(H) = Hosts
(DC) = Defending champions
Full results

See also
List of college swimming and diving teams

References

NCAA Division I Swimming And Diving Championships
NCAA Division I Swimming And Diving Championships
NCAA Division I Women's Swimming and Diving Championships